Mike Clarke (born August 12, 1953) is a Canadian former professional ice hockey player who, in 1973, was drafted by both the National Hockey League and World Hockey Association.

Clarke was selected by the Philadelphia Flyers in the 3rd round (42nd overall) of the 1973 NHL Amateur Draft, and was also selected by the New England Whalers in the 2nd round (26th overall) of the 1973 WHA Amateur Draft.

Although Clarke went on to play eleven seasons of professional hockey, he never played a game in either of major leagues that had drafted him.

Playing career
Born 1953 in Didsbury, Alberta, Canada, Clarke played major junior hockey with the Calgary Centennials of the Western Hockey League. He began his professional career in the American Hockey League (AHL) in 1973 with the Richmond Robins - then the minor league affiliate of the Philadelphia Flyers. Following his rookie campaign, Clarke was bounced around the minor leagues; playing in the AHL, NAHL, IHL, and EHL.

Clarke achieved his best success with the Flint Generals during the 1976-77 season when he racked up 108 points in 78 games with IHL team. In all he would play five seasons and 342 games with the Generals, scoring a total of 380 points for the Flint team.

Midway through the 1981-82 season, the Generals dealt Clarke to the Fort Wayne Komets where he continued to produce by scoring 127 points in 127 games for the Komets.

Clarke's 11 season professional career concluded following the 1983-84 season. He retired as a member of the Kalamazoo Wings after being traded to that team by Fort Wayne earlier that season. His total professional statistics are summed up with 721 points in 747 regular season games, with another 66 points scored in 60 post-season games.

Career statistics

Further reading
Toledo Blade - Feb 10, 1978 - Page 15 - He Shoots, He Scores' Give Announcers Laryngitis at Flint
The Milwaukee Journal - Dec 22, 1978- Page 15 - Admirals' Defeat Gift Wrapped
The Milwaukee Sentinel - Dec 23, 1978 - Part 2, Page 1 - Flint Spoils Admirals' Christmas
The Argus-Press - Feb 3, 1979 - Page 11 - Admirals as Good as Generals
The Milwaukee Sentinel - Part 2, Page 2 - Feb 3, 1979 - Admirals tie
Toledo Blade - Dec 21, 1981- Page 33 - Fraser's Clutch Goals Lift Diggers To Overtime Victory
The Argus-Press - Apr 10, 1982- Page 10 - Toledo Two Up On Flint

References

External links

1953 births
Adirondack Red Wings players
Calgary Centennials players
Flint Generals (IHL) players
Fort Wayne Komets players
Kalamazoo Wings (1974–2000) players
Living people
New England Whalers draft picks
New Haven Nighthawks players
Philadelphia Firebirds (NAHL) players
Philadelphia Flyers draft picks
Richmond Robins players
Springfield Indians players
Canadian ice hockey centres